2003 Emperor's Cup Final was the 83rd final of the Emperor's Cup competition. The final was played at National Stadium in Tokyo on January 1, 2004. Júbilo Iwata won the championship.

Overview
Júbilo Iwata won their 2nd title, by defeating Cerezo Osaka 1–0 with Gral goal.

Match details

See also
2003 Emperor's Cup

References

Emperor's Cup
2003 in Japanese football
Júbilo Iwata matches
Cerezo Osaka matches